Obake (Japanese) – Shapeshifting spirits
 Obariyon (Japanese) – Spook which rides piggyback on a human victim and becomes unbearably heavy
 Obayifo (Ashanti) – Vampiric possession spirit
 Obia (West Africa) – Gigantic animal that serves witches
 Oceanid (Greek) – Nymph daughters of Oceanus
 Odei (Basque) – Storm spirit
 Odin (Norse mythology) – King of Asgard
 Odmience (Slavic) – Changeling
 Og (Jewish) – Giant king of the Amorites
 Ogopogo (Canadian) Canadian Lake Monster
 Ogun (Nigeria) – Iron god for the Yoruba people (South Western Nigeria)
 Ogre (Medieval folklore) – Large, grotesque humanoid
 Oiwa (Japanese) – Ghost of a woman with a distorted face who was murdered by her husband
 Ojáncanu (Cantabrian) – Giant cyclops who embodies evil.
 Okiku (Japanese) – Spirit of a plate-counting servant girl, associated with the "Okiku-Mushi" worm
 Ōkubi (Japanese) – Death spirit
 Okuri-inu (Japanese) – Dog or wolf that follows travelers at night, similar to the Black dog of English folklore
 Ole-Higue (Guyanese) – Vampiric hag who takes the form of a fireball at night
 Ōmukade (Japanese) – Giant, human-eating centipede that lives in the mountains
 Oni (Japanese) – Large, grotesque humanoid demon, usually having red skin and horns
 Onibi (Japanese) – Spectral fire
 Onmoraki (Japanese) – Bird-demon created from the spirits of freshly dead corpses
 Onocentaur (Medieval Bestiaries) – Human-donkey hybrid
 Onoskelis (Greek) – Shapeshifting demon
 Onryō (Japanese) – Vengeful ghost that manifests in a physical rather than a spectral form
 Onza (Aztec and Latin American folklore) – Wild cat, possibly a subspecies of cougar
 Oozlum bird (Unknown origin) – Bird that flies backwards
 Ophiotaurus (Greek) – Bull-serpent hybrid
 Opinicus (Heraldic) – Lion-eagle hybrid, similar to a griffin, but with leonine forelimbs
 Orang Bunian (Malay) – Forest spirit
 Orang Minyak (Malay) – Spectral rapist
 Ördög (Hungarian) – Shapeshifting demon
 Oread (Greek) – Mountain nymph
 Ork (Tyrolean) – Little people and house spirits
 Orobas (European) – Horse-headed, honest oracle classed as a demon
 Orphan Bird (Medieval Bestiaries) – Peacock-eagle-swan-crane hybrid
 Orthrus (Greek) – Two-headed dog
 Osiris (Hellenized) – God of the dead and the judge of the underworld
 Oshun (Nigeria) – God of love and fertility
 Otso (Finnish) – Bear spirit
 Ouroboros (Worldwide) – Mystic serpent/dragon that eats its own tail
 Ovinnik (Slavic) – Malevolent threshing house spirit
Owlman (Cornish) – Owl-like humanoid

O